Norman Dubie (April 10, 1945--February 20, 2023) was an American poet from Barre, VT.

Life
He was the author of twenty-eight collections of poetry. Dubie's work often assumes historical personae and has been included in The New Yorker, Ploughshares, The Paris Review, FIELD, Narrative, The American Poetry Review, The Fiddlehead, and Blackbird, an online journal of literature and the arts. His work has been included in numerous Norton anthologies of poetry.

With his latest collection of poems, The Quotations of Bone, published in 2015 by Copper Canyon Press, Dubie was the international recipient of the 2016 Griffin Poetry Prize. The poems in this collection confront viciousness in its many forms.

Awards
Dubie was the recipient of numerous honors and awards. These include fellowships from the National Endowment for the Arts and the Ingram Merrill Foundation, the Bess Hokin Prize from Poetry Magazine and the Modern Poetry Association, and the John Simon Guggenheim Memorial Foundation Award. In 2002, he won the PEN Center USA prize for his collection, The Mercy Seat: Collected and New Poems. Dubie is a graduate of Goddard College and the Iowa Writer's Workshop. He taught in the graduate Creative Writing Program at Arizona State University, in Tempe, Arizona, where he was Regents' Professor of English.

The Tucson-based band Calexico have stated that Dubie's poetry was very influential on their album Carried to Dust, particularly the song "Two Silver Trees".

Selected books
 Selected & New Poems (1986) 
 Groom Falconer (1990) 
 Radio Sky (1992) 
 The Mercy Seat : Collected and New Poems 1967-2001 (Copper Canyon Press, 2001) 
 Ordinary Mornings of a Coliseum (Copper Canyon Press, 2004) 
 The Insomniac Liar of Topo (Copper Canyon Press, 2007)
 The Volcano (Copper Canyon Press, 2010)
 Quotations of Bone (Copper Canyon Press, 2015)

Anthologies
 The Morrow Anthology of Younger American Poets
 The Norton Anthology of Modern and Contemporary Poetry

References

Sources
 Academy of American Poets

External links
 The Norman Dubie Papers are housed at the University of Iowa Special Collections & University Archives.
 Norman Dubie's Poetry Foundation profile
 The Spirit Tablets at Goa Lake
 Norman Dubie's poem "Gotterdammerung" in  Gulf Coast: A Journal of Literature and Fine Arts (25.1).
 Brief biography
 Biography, poetry excerpts from Griffin Poetry Prize website
Interview with The Rusty Toque
Interview with Nancy Mitchell and Adam Tavel for Plume Poetry

1945 births
Living people
American male poets
People from Barre, Vermont
Poets from Vermont
Iowa Writers' Workshop alumni
20th-century American poets
21st-century American poets
20th-century American male writers
21st-century American male writers